Seiganji Dam  is an earthfill dam located in Kumamoto Prefecture in Japan. The dam is used for flood control and irrigation. The catchment area of the dam is 17.5 km2. The dam impounds about 19  ha of land when full and can store 3302 thousand cubic meters of water. The construction of the dam was started on 1969 and completed in 1978.

See also
List of dams in Japan

References

Dams in Kumamoto Prefecture